Oncidium noezlianum is a species of plant in the genus Oncidium in the family Orchidaceae.

References 

noezliana